Asger is a predominantly Danish language masculine given name derived from the Old Norse elements Æsir or ás, meaning "gods" and geirr, meaning "spear".  

Individuals bearing the name Asger include: 
Asger Aaboe (1922–2007), Danish historian of the exact sciences and mathematician
Asger Christensen (born 1958), Danish politician 
Asger Lund Christiansen (1927–1998), Danish cellist and composer
Asger Hamerik, also Hammerich, (1843–1923), Danish composer of classical music
Asger Jorn (1914–1973), Danish painter, sculptor, ceramic artist, and author
Asger Ostenfeld (1866–1931), Danish civil engineer
Asger Sørensen (born 1996), Danish footballer
Asger Svendsen, Danish professor music, performer of bassoon, woodwind and chamber music

References

Masculine given names
Danish masculine given names
Scandinavian masculine given names